Raymundo Taco Sabio (2 March 1946 – 16 September 2022) was a Filipino Roman Catholic priest.

Sabio was born in the Philippines and was ordained to the priesthood un 1971. He was a member of the Missionaries of the Sacred Heart since 1969. Sabio served as the prefect of the Apostolic Prefecture of the Marshall Islands from 2007 until his resignation in 2017.

References

1946 births
2022 deaths
Filipino Roman Catholic priests
Missionaries of the Sacred Heart
People from Iloilo